Milenko Špoljarić (born 24 January 1967) is a football manager and a former Cypriot international football midfielder.

Club career
Born in Belišće, SR Croatia, SFR Yugoslavia, Špoljarić played for Yugoslav First League clubs NK Osijek and OFK Beograd. He left in 1992 signing with Cypriot club Apollon Limassol where he will play 11 seasons all the way until 2003. Before retiring from professional playing he played one last season with AEP Paphos. With Apollon he scored 78 goals in 250 appearances.

International career
After playing several seasons in Cyprus, he made his debut for Cyprus in an October 1997 World Cup qualification match against Luxembourg and earned a total of 22 caps (1 unofficial), scoring 9 goals. His final international was a March 2001 World Cup qualification match against Estonia.

After retiring he initiated his coaching career.

Personal life
His father is an ethnic Croat while his mother is an ethnic Serb. He has three sons: Alexander, Matija and Danilo.

References

External links
 

1967 births
Living people
People from Belišće
Croatian people of Serbian descent
Croatian emigrants to Cyprus
Cypriot people of Serbian descent
Cypriot people of Croatian descent
Association football midfielders
Yugoslav footballers
Croatian footballers
Cypriot footballers
Cyprus international footballers
NK Osijek players
OFK Beograd players
Apollon Limassol FC players
AEP Paphos FC players
Yugoslav First League players
Yugoslav Second League players
Cypriot First Division players
Cypriot football managers
Aris Limassol FC managers